Phrynocephalus scutellatus, the gray toadhead agama, is a species of agamid lizard found in Iran, Afghanistan, and Pakistan.

References

scutellatus
Reptiles described in 1807
Taxa named by Guillaume-Antoine Olivier